The Nelson Building Society is the oldest building society in New Zealand. The head office is located in Nelson, New Zealand.

Branches 
The Nelson Building Society has a total of 8 branches, all located in the South Island. The branches are located in:

 Nelson
 Richmond
 Motueka
 Murchison
 Westport
 Greymouth
 Tākaka
 Ashburton

References

External links
Nelson Building Society

Building societies of New Zealand
Banks established in 1862
New Zealand companies established in 1862